Avraham Goldberg (Hebrew: אברהם גולדברג, January 22, 1913 – April 13, 2012) was an Israeli Talmud scholar.

Life
Goldberg was born in Pittsburgh, and was educated at yeshivot Torah V'Daat and Chafetz Chaim, as well as at the University of Pittsburgh, where he studied English literature.  He was ordained at the Jewish Theological Seminary in 1941.

After serving as a chaplain in the United States armed forces during World War II, Goldberg moved to Israel to study at the Hebrew University in Jerusalem, where he remained until his retirement. In 1952 Goldberg received a PhD in Talmud from Hebrew University, with a critical edition of Massechet Ohalot serving as his dissertation.

After graduation, Goldberg served at the Hebrew University as professor and professor emeritus of Talmud, as well as chair of the Talmud department. He also served as visiting professor at the Jewish Theological Seminary and University of Pennsylvania.

Books
Goldberg published four books: Critical editions of the Mishnah for Massechtot Oholot, Shabbat, Eruvin, and an analytic study of Tosefta Bava Kamma.  He also published many articles in scholarly journals.

Goldberg was married to Rivka Abramowitz.

Awards
 In 1955, Goldberg was awarded the Rav Kook Prize from the city of Tel Aviv for his dissertation.
 In 2000, he was awarded the Israel Prize in Talmudic studies.

References

See also
List of Israel Prize recipients

1913 births
2012 deaths
Talmudists
Israel Prize in Talmud studies recipients
People from Pittsburgh